Kfarhamam  (also Kafarhamam, Kafrhamam, Kfar Hamam, Kafar Hamam) is a small village located in the Arqoob region in the Hasbaya District in Southern Lebanon, which lies on the eastern side of the Nabatieh Governorate. Kfarhamam is bounded by El Mari village from the south, Hebbariye village from the north, Kfar Chouba from the east, and Rachaya Al Foukhar from the west. According to the latest electoral lists, the population of the village today is about 3,500, of which only a very small minority reside in the village.

The village has a strategic location in the Hermon mountains of Lebanon, as it overlooks the Upper Galilee of Israel and is very close by to the Golan Heights and the Shebaa farms. Its importance also lies in the fact that its very close to an intersection of the borders of three countries; those being Lebanon, Israel, and Syria.

History
Kfarhamam is originally a Syriac word. Kfar means house and hamam means peace, hence Kfarhamam means "the house of peace". The village is about 500 years old and has been destroyed and rebuilt many times since the 1970s. Many people had escaped the village due to the security problems of the region, until in the late 1970s the village was fully evacuated for a certain period of time. Fifty percent of these evacuees had to immigrate to Brazil and Canada to earn their living; most of which still have not returned until this day. Even today, the villagers of Kfarhamam usually live in foreign countries/cities due to the many effects of the Israeli occupation and the Lebanese Governments' negligence towards the Arqoob region in which the village lies. Most of these villagers are distributed between Brazil, Canada, the Persian Gulf, Europe, and the more advanced cities of Lebanon such as Beirut, Saida, and the Bekaa valley.

In 1838, during the Ottoman era, Eli Smith noted the  population of  Kfarhamam as being  Sunni Muslim.

Important intellectual figures of Kfarhamam include the Brazilian Member of Parliament in the 1970s Omar Alaa Eldin, the village's previous Mokhtar (village mayor) Abdo Ali Abdulhamid, the previous Lebanese Member of Parliament Ahmad Sweid, the Judge Mohamed Sweid, and Dr. Ghazi Chahrour who happened to be one of the first few doctors to find a cure for certain cases of cancer around the world, which he achieved through his work between Europe and Brazil. It is thought that Dr. Chahrour, holder of both the Lebanese and Brazilian nationalities, was later assassinated by certain Pharmaceutical corporations, but so far no information has been revealed about his disappearance.

Israeli Occupation [1978-2000]
During the Israeli occupation of the village for 22 years, the village did not hesitate in offering its young men to fight for the cause of liberation; a lot of them ended up as prisoners, martyrs, or exiles. One example of these is its previous Mokhtar Abdo Ali Abdulhamid who was exiled several times, last of which was in 1994. The reason for his latest exile lied in his uncovering of an Israeli plan to turn the Arqoob area of Southern Lebanon into Jewish Falasha settlements, and his work back then with the leaders of the region such as Kamel al Assaad and the Lebanese government to prevent this plan from materializing;  that in addition to his refusal along with the other villagers to work with the Israelis and their allies. Abdul Hamid managed to serve as the mayor of Kfarhamam from 1950 till 2001. Many other examples are present; for a lot of the villagers joined the Lebanese Communist Party during the years of occupation to fight for the liberation of their village, and several of them have either been killed, jailed, or gone missing. Of these Communists is one of the earliest Lebanese fighters to get killed while struggling for liberation, Yehya El-Khaled, who was honored by naming the main street in the village after his name. Kfarhamam was the HQ of Norway's :no:Norbatts 3rd plt Coy B at UNIFIL during the UNIFIL-mission 1978-1998.

Today, the villagers of Kfarhamam live a more peaceful life. Although they were highly affected by the 2006 Lebanon war, many of these villagers have returned and are planning to live in Southern Lebanon. Unlike many other villages in the region, Kfarhamam is not affiliated with any single Lebanese political party. The majority of its people are previous Leftists who don't seem to be able to identify neither with the fundamentalist ideology of Hizbollah nor with the other Pro-Western parties in Lebanon.
The first people to reside in kfarhamam origin is unknown, no official document shows the origin or where they came from but some elderly says that they came from Morocco, some says they came from palestine

Geography
Kfarhamam is known for its many different kinds of trees, mainly of which are pine, olives, figs, and grapes. The village's production of these fruits is much higher than its demand. There are small Roman ruins in Kfar Hamam, as well as 3 caves, and some historic tunnels; the security problems of the region have prevented further excavation in those locations. In addition to that, the village is rich in water springs and wells and is hence self-dependent in terms of water supply.

References

Bibliography

Sources 
:ar:كفرحمام

"Mabrouk et Tahrir" documentary, Dir. Dalia FATHALLAH, Prod. INA - IMAGES PLUS, Info here: https://web.archive.org/web/20071106161101/http://imagesplus.org/pages/0_docu_m.htm

External links
 Kfar Hamam, Localiban

Populated places in Hasbaya District